Groveton is an extinct unincorporated Civil War era village in Prince William County, Virginia. The village is located at the intersection of U.S. Highway 29 (Lee Highway) and Groveton Road on land that is now part of Manassas National Battlefield Park, a National Park Service property. The only remnant of the village is the L. Dogan House, a small, white frame structure, and the nearby Groveton Confederate Cemetery that contains the remains of over 260 Confederate soldiers.

See also
Former counties, cities, and towns of Virginia

References

Unincorporated communities in Prince William County, Virginia
Washington metropolitan area
Unincorporated communities in Virginia
Manassas National Battlefield Park